Cerro del Nacimiento is an Andean volcano of the Cordillera de la Ramada range, in the Catamarca Province of Argentina.

See also
 List of mountains in the Andes

References

Nacimiento, Cerro del